The County of Leiningen consists on a group of counties (some of them with that were ruled with Imperial immediacy), which were ruled by the Leiningen family.

Most of these counties were annexed by the First French Republic in 1793, after French troops conquered the Left Bank of the Rhine during the War of the First Coalition. Several family branches subsequently received secularized abbeys as compensation, but shortly afterwards, these new counties were mediatized and the family lost its immediacy. Today, the only existing branch is that of the Princes of Leiningen.

Origins

The first count of Leiningen about whom anything definite is known was a certain Emich II (d. before 1138). He (and perhaps his father Emich I) built Leiningen Castle, which is now known as "Old Leiningen Castle" (German: Burg Altleiningen), around 1100 to 1110. Nearby Höningen Abbey was built around 1120 as the family's burial place. The first reliable mention of the family dates back to 1128, when Emicho, Count of Leiningen testified to a document from Adalbert I of Saarbrücken, Archbishop of Mainz.

This family became extinct in the male line when Count Frederick II died about 1214 or 1220. Frederick I's sister, Liutgarde, married Simon II, Count of Saarbrücken. One of Liutgarde's sons, also named Frederick, inherited the lands of the counts of Leiningen, and he took their arms and name as Frederick II (d. 1237). Known as a Minnesinger, one of his songs was included in the Codex Manesse. Before 1212, he built himself a new castle called Hardenburg, about 10 kilometers south of Altleiningen. This was outside the county of Leiningen on the territory of Limburg Abbey, of which his uncle was the overlord (Vogt), which caused some trouble.

His eldest son, Simon (c. 1204–1234), married Gertrude, heiress of the County of Dagsburg, bringing that property into the family. They had no children and Simon's two brothers inherited the county of Leiningen together: Frederick III (d. 1287) also inherited Dagsburg and Emich IV (d. c. 1276) Landeck Castle; he founded the town of Landau, but the Landeck branch extinguished with his grandson in 1290. Frederick III, who disliked sharing Leiningen castle with his brother, had a new castle built in 1238–41 about 5 kilometres northeast of Leiningen, called Neuleiningen Castle ("New Leiningen"). Frederick III's son, Frederick IV (d. 1316), had two sons, who divided the county into Leiningen-Dagsburg and Leiningen-Hardenburg.

History

Having increased its possessions, the Leiningen family was divided around 1317 into two branches:

Leiningen-Westerburg
The elder of these, whose head was a landgrave, died out in 1467. Upon this event, its lands fell to a female, the last landgrave's sister Margaret, wife of Reinhard, Lord of Westerburg, and their descendants were known as the family of Leiningen-Westerburg. Later this family was divided into two branches, those of Leiningen-Westerburg-Alt-Leiningen and Leiningen-Westerburg-Neu-Leiningen, both of which are extinct today.

After the French Revolution, the Left Bank of the Rhine was conquered during the War of the First Coalition and annexed by France in 1793. The two counts of Alt- and Neu- Leiningen were arrested and jailed in Paris. They lost their territories. In 1803 they were compensated with secularized Ilbenstadt Abbey (at Niddatal) and Engelthal Abbey. The German mediatization brought an end to these short-lived counties in 1806, when their territories were divided between the Grand Duchy of Berg, the Grand Duchy of Hesse, Nassau-Weilburg and Nassau-Usingen. Ilbenstadt Abbey was sold by the House of Leiningen-Westerburg-Altleiningen in 1921, Engelthal Abbey by the heirs of the House of Leiningen-Westerburg-Neuleiningen in 1952.

Leiningen-Hardenburg
Meanwhile, the younger branch of the Leiningens, known as the family of Leiningen-Hardenburg, was flourishing. On 27 June 1560, this branch was divided into the lines of Leiningen-Dagsburg-Hardenburg, founded by Count Johann Philip (d. 1562), and Leiningen-Dagsburg-Heidesheim or Falkenburg, founded by Count Emicho (d. 1593).

In 1658 Leiningen-Dagsburg-Falkenburg divided into 
 Leiningen-Dagsburg (extinct 1706)
 Leiningen-Heidesheim (extinct 1766)
 Leiningen-Guntersblum (extinct 1774)

The county of Leiningen-Dagsburg was inherited by Leiningen-Dagsburg-Hardenburg in 1774.

Leiningen-Guntersblum was divided between two further side branches: 
 Leiningen-Dagsburg-Falkenburg-Guntersblum, which was deprived of its lands on the left bank of the Rhine by France, but in 1803 received Billigheim as a compensation, then called Leiningen-Billigheim. In 1845 they also acquired  Neuburg Castle at Obrigheim. The branch became extinct in 1925.
 Leiningen-Heidesheim, which in 1803 received Neudenau and became known as Leiningen-Neudenau (extinct in 1910).

In 1779, the head of the Leiningen-Dagsburg-Hardenburg line was raised to the rank of a Prince of the Holy Roman Empire with the title of Prince of Leiningen. In 1801, this line was deprived of its lands on the left bank of the Rhine by France, but in 1803 it received Amorbach Abbey as an ample compensation for these losses. A few years later, the Principality of Leiningen at Amorbach was mediatized, and its territory is now included mainly in Baden, but partly in Bavaria and in Hesse. Amorbach Abbey is still today the family seat of the Prince of Leiningen.

Since 1991, the head of the princely line has been Prince Andreas (b. 1955). 
His eldest brother, Prince Karl Emich was excluded from succession after he married morganatically.

Rulers

House of Leiningen

Partitions of Leiningen under Leiningen family

Table of rulers

The post-mediatization

Succession in the Principality of Leiningen

Carl Friedrich Wilhelm, 1st Prince of Leiningen (1724–1807)
Emich Carl, 2nd Prince of Leiningen (1763–1814)
Carl, 3rd Prince of Leiningen (1804–1856)
Ernst, 4th Prince of Leiningen (1830–1904)
Emich, 5th Prince of Leiningen (1866–1939)
Karl, 6th Prince of Leiningen (1898–1946)
Emich, 7th Prince of Leiningen (1926–1991)
 (born 1955)
his heir-apparent, Ferdinand, Hereditary Prince of Leiningen (born 1982)

Succession in the County of Altleiningen
Christian Karl, Count of Leiningen-Altleiningen (18 Sep 1757 – 1 Dec 1811)
Friedrich I Ludwig Christian, Count of Leiningen-Altleiningen (2 Nov 1761 – 9 Aug 1839)
Friedrich II Eduard, Count of Leiningen-Altleiningen (20 May 1806 – 5 Jun 1868)
Friedrich III Wipprecht Franz, Count of Leiningen-Altleiningen (30 Dec 1852 – 7 Feb 1916), nephew
Gustav Friedrich Oskar, Count of Leiningen-Altleiningen (8 Feb 1876 – 23 Jul 1929)

Succession in the County of Neuleiningen
Ferdinand Karl III, Count of Leiningen-Neuleiningen (8 Sep 1767 – 26 Nov 1813)
August George Gustav, Count of Leiningen-Neuleiningen (19 Feb 1770 – 9 Oct 1849)
Christian Franz Seraph Vincenz, Count of Leiningen-Neuleiningen (1810 – 1856)
George Karl August, Count of Leiningen-Neuleiningen (27 Aug 1789 – 17 Mar 1865), cousin of the previous
Wilhelm, Count of Leiningen-Neuleiningen (16 Feb 1824 – 29 Apr 1887) - Inherited by Altleiningen

See also
House of Leiningen
Prince of Leiningen
Princess of Leiningen

Notes

References
 Constantin von Wurzbach: Leiningen, das Haus, Genealogie. In: Biographisches Lexikon des Kaiserthums Oesterreich. 14. Theil. Kaiserlich-königliche Hof- und Staatsdruckerei, Wien 1865, S. 328 f.
 Detlev Schwennicke, Europaische Stammtafeln, New Series, Vol. XVII, Tafel 62. Vol. XXIX, Tafel 73. Vol. XXIX, Tafel 72.
 Europaische Stammtafeln, by Wilhelm Karl, Prinz zu Isenburg, Vol. IV, Tafel 32.
 Genealogisches Handbuch des Adels, Adelslexikon Band VII, Band 97 der Gesamtreihe, C. A. Starke Verlag, Limburg (Lahn) 1989, 
 
 

Attribution
  This work in turn cites:

External links 
 European Heraldry page 
 Website of the Prince of Leiningen
 Genealogy - Grafen von Leiningen
 Leiningen
 Our Royal Titled Noble and Commoner Ancestors - Leiningen and Westerburg (click on the links to travel between members)
 Medieval Lands - Grafen von Leiningen

 
Counties of the Holy Roman Empire
Former states and territories of Rhineland-Palatinate
Upper Rhenish Circle